Ante Peterlić (18 May 1936 – 12 July 2007) was a Croatian screenwriter and film director. He is best known for his film Accidental Life, his debut feature film.

Peterlić was a prominent young film critic, and a professor of film theory at the Faculty of Humanities and Social Sciences in Zagreb. In the 1960s, he directed his first short TV drama, and was active as an assistant director in several feature films and documentaries, working also as a script doctor.

References

External links 

1936 births
2007 deaths
People from Kaštela
Croatian film directors
Academic staff of the University of Zagreb
Faculty of Humanities and Social Sciences, University of Zagreb alumni
Croatian film critics
Film theorists